Country Home may refer to:

Country Home (magazine), American lifestyle magazine
The Country Home, formerly Farm & Fireside, American lifestyle magazine
Country house, house or mansion in the countryside

See also
Country House (disambiguation)